Major General Mai Văn Cường (born 1941) was a Mikoyan-Gurevich MiG-21 pilot of the Vietnam People's Air Force, he flew with the 921st fighter regiment and tied for second place amongst Vietnam War fighter aces with eight kills.

20-year-old Mai Van Cuong began training as a MiG-17 pilot in the Soviet Union from 1961-64, advancing to the MiG-21 from 1965-66, and has acquired a unique distinction of being the 'top drone-killing pilot of the Vietnam War', achieving no less than six kills over US Ryan 147 Firebee/Lightning Bug drone; his victory-claims list including the kills officially acknowledged by the VPAF is as follows:

 08 October 1966, USAF F-105 Thunderchief, US-side does not confirm;
 28 April 1967, USAF F-105D Thunderchief, pilot Caras (KIA);
 16 May 1967, Firebee/Lightning Bug UAV drone;
 30 September 1967, USAF F-105 Thunderchief, US-side does not confirm;
 07 October 1967, F-4 Phantom II, damaged;
 19 June 1968, Firebee/Lightning Bug UAV drone;
 03 September 1968, Firebee/Lightning Bug UAV drone;
 20 September 1968, Firebee/Lightning Bug UAV drone;
 09 February 1969, Firebee/Lightning Bug UAV drone;
 24 June 1969, Firebee/Lightning Bug UAV drone.

See also
List of Vietnam War flying aces
Weapons of the Vietnam War

References

Bibliography

North Vietnamese military personnel of the Vietnam War
Living people
North Vietnamese Vietnam War flying aces
Date of birth missing (living people)
Place of birth missing (living people)
1941 births